Serkalem Biset Abrha, also known as Abrha Serkalem Biset, (born March 8, 1987) is a runner from Ethiopia who competes in long distance running and has won several major international marathons.

Running career
Abrha's first major races outside of Ethiopia were in India's Delhi International Half Marathon and the Standard Chartered Lahore 10K from 2005 to 2007. She finished second in the half marathon in 2006, winning $1,000.

In 2008, Abrha won the Maas Marathon (Dutch:Maasmarathon of the Basse-Meuse) in rural Visé, Belgium.

Later that year, she raced the Hartford Marathon in Connecticut. More than 5,000 runners started out from Bushnell Park at 8 a.m. for the 15th annual race. The racers crossed the Connecticut River, traveled north through East Hartford and South Windsor before doubling back and crossing the Founders Bridge once again. As Abrha ran back into Bushnell Park and under the Soldiers and Sailors Memorial Arch toward the finish line, it was clear she was the dominant winner. Her time was 2:38:37.

In 2009, she went to Georgia for the Atlanta Marathon. More than 15,000 people were signed up to run, and the start promised fast times as the temperature hovered in the 40-degree range. Abrha lead all the women and won the $3,000 purse prize.

She came to New York in 2009, where she faced tough competition in the New York City Marathon. Still, she ran a 2:37:20. She finished eighth, winning $5,000. She was just behind Ethiopian Bizunesh Deba, one of her training partners.

In 2010, she finished third at the Las Vegas Marathon, putting her in the winnings with $4,000 and a stronger national profile. She followed that with finishing third (2:33:52) in the Barcelona Marathon in Spain. The top four female racers were Ethiopian, and they finished several minutes before the next runner from Kenya.

In 2011, she won the California International Marathon in Sacramento, California. She would repeat the win again in 2015, winning $10,000 for her time of 2:31:29.

Back in 2010, she surprised Canadian spectators by winning the 20th running of the Marathon Oasis de Montreal.  She was back in 2011 to claim the title again, this time in 2:33:21. In the 2011 race report, the Montreal Gazette inexplicably claimed that she was 17, though World Athletics showed her birth date to be 1987, and they reported a year earlier that she was 23.

NYC marathon in 2011 saw Ethiopian runners Firehiwot Dado and Deba finish first and second—Abrha was 15th with a time of 2:33:22.

In October 2015, she came to the Midwest for the Twin Cities Marathon from Minneapolis to St. Paul. The cities had been roiling for weeks with Black Lives Matter protests due to large socioeconomic gaps between the Black community and all others in the region. Protest leaders threatened to disrupt the marathon near the finish line, prompting concern for the race organizers and 15,000 race participants. However, an agreement was reached, and the St. Paul Black Lives Matter group agreed to stage a "die-in" near the finish line instead of blocking the race course. Abrah lead the women and won in 2:31:39, just a few seconds ahead of Kenyan Jane Kibii.
 
In the late 2010s, some of her other notable achievements were winning first place in the Staten Island Half Marathon on October 8, 2017, with the time 1:16:26; winning third place in the female category for the France Run 8K on August 20, 2017, in Central Park with the time of 32:01; and winning second place in the Hope & Possibility 4K Race on June 25, 2017, (also in Central Park) with the time 22:20. She finished in the top three in multiple major marathons, including her second-place finish at the 2016 LA Marathon.

She had another marathon win in 2017 when she sped past the other competitors to win the overall race of the Cleveland Marathon held on May 21.

One of her greatest achievements was winning first place at the 2018 Philadelphia Marathon in 2:14:47, which set a course record.

Personal life
She has trained with Bizunesh Deba, Genna Tufa, and Atalelech Asfaw in New York and in the high altitude of Albuquerque, New Mexico. Part of her training has included seasonal trips over the winter to Addis Ababa, Ethiopia, to run at high altitudes with her training partners.

Achievements

External links
Serkalem Biset Association of Road Racing Statistician profile
Serkalem Biset World Athletics Profile

References

1987 births
Living people
Ethiopian female marathon runners
Ethiopian female long-distance runners
World Athletics Championships athletes for Ethiopia
21st-century Ethiopian women